The 2019 Clemson Tigers women's soccer team represented Clemson University during the 2019 NCAA Division I women's soccer season.  The Tigers were led by head coach Ed Radwanski, in his eighth season.  Home games were played at Riggs Field.  This was the team's 26th season playing organized soccer.  All of those seasons were played in the Atlantic Coast Conference.

Previous season

The 2018 Clemson women's soccer team finished the season with a 12–9–0 overall record and a 6–4–0 ACC record. The Tigers qualified for the ACC Tournament as the fifth-seed.  The Tigers overcame Boston College in the Quarterfinals, but fell 0–1 to North Carolina in the Semifinals.  The Tigers earned an at-large bid into the 2018 NCAA Division I Women's Soccer Tournament for the sixth season in a row. As an unseeded team in the Stanford Bracket, Clemson lost to Ole Miss at home 1–2 to end their season.

Offseason

Departures

Recruiting Class

Squad

Roster

Updated November 26, 2019

Team management

Source:

Schedule

Source:

|-
!colspan=6 style=""| Exhibition

|-
!colspan=6 style=""| Non-Conference Regular season

|-
!colspan=6 style=""| Conference Regular season

|-
!colspan=6 style=""| ACC Tournament

|-
!colspan=6 style=""| NCAA Tournament

Goals Record

Disciplinary record

Awards and honors

Rankings

References

External links

Clemson
Clemson Women's Soccer
Clemson
2019